The IUCN WCPA Fred M. Packard Award is an international merit award which is made by the International Union for Conservation of Nature
to individuals or groups in recognition of "outstanding service to protected and conserved areas" across the globe. The award is named for the individual who served as the Secretary to the World Commission on Protected Areas in the early 1970s. Packard initially established the award in recognition of the "valour" of field wardens fighting and at times losing their lives to poachers in the course of conservation work, mostly in the developing world. At the third World National Parks Congress in Bali, 1982 the award was expanded to include people and organisations who have "contributed to protected areas far above and beyond the call of duty".

Packard Awardees 1982

 Syed Ahmed (India)
 Kepala Seksis (Indonesia)
 Charles Gibson Connell (UK)
 Insa Diatta and Yanya Danfa (Senegal)
 Myles Dunphy (Australia)
 Jose Rafael Garcia (Venezuela)
 Sylvanus Gorio (Papua New Guinea)
 Jean-Paul Harroy (Belgium)
 Miravaldo de Jesus Siguara (Brazil)
 Joseph Kioko (Kenya)
 Peter Logwe (and the Kidepo Valley National Park Ranger Force)
 Fergus Lothian (Canada)
 George Ruhle (United States)
 Fateh Singh Rathore (India)
 Soedjarwo and his Staff (Indonesia)
 Robert I. Standish (United States)
 Peter Stanton (Australia)

Packard Awardees 1984

 Bob Brown (Australia)
 Gabriel Charles (Saint Lucia))
 Passe Manner (Senegal)
 Robert Milne (United States)

Packard Awardees 1985

 Sudabar Ali (India)
 Shri Qutub (India)

Packard Awardees 1987

 Mamadou Sadio (Senegal)
 Ahmed Tcholli (Niger)
 Robert Tei (Ivory Coast)

Packard Awardees 1988

 Ray Dasmann (United States)
 Ricardo Luti (Argentina)
 Kenton Miller (United States)
 Josip Movcan (Yugoslavia)
 Francisco Ponce (El Salvador)

Packard Awardees 1990

 Biocenosis AC and Lic. Manzanilla Shafer
 Gerardo Budowski
 Samuel A. Cooke
 Harold Eidsvik
 John Foster

Packard Awardees 1992

 Abdulaziz H. Abuzinada
 Carlos Castaño Uribe
 Mario Gabaldón and the staff of INPARQUES
 Madeleine de Grandmaison 
 Almirante Ibsen de Gusmao Camara
 Jorge Ignacio Hernandez Camacho
 Tom Van't Hof
 Aila Keto
 Vladimar Krinitsky
 Hugh Lamprey
 Joseph Mburugu 
 Carlos Mendez Montenegro  and Alex Rudolfo Mendez Del Cid
 P. Srinivas
 Vladislav Vassiliev

Packard Awardees 1993

 Lars-Erik Esping and his Staff
 Arne Kaasik
 Tasuku Ono

Packard Awardees 1994

 Ian Craven
 P.H. C. Bing Lucas
 Troels M. Pedersen
 Robbie Robinson
 Luis Honorio Rolon
 Robert Ferdinand Schloeth
 I. Made Sutaadi
 Edgar Wayburn

Packard Awardees 1995

 Abdullah Bin Abdulaziz Bin Moammar

Packard Awardees 1996

 Peter Hitchcock
 Abeedulah Jan
 Kotaro Kusakabe
 Perez Olindo
 H.S. Panwar
 Effendy A. Sumardja

Packard Awardees 1997

 D.D. Boro
 A.K. Brahma
 Jorge Cabrera Hidalgo
 Ricardo Pascual Garcia
 Silvino Gonzalez
 Hannu Ormio
 Kyran D. Thelen

Packard Awardees 1998

 Bob Carr
 Graeme Kelleher

Packard Awardees 1999

 Woo Bo-Myeong
 Datuk Lamri bin Ali

Packard Awardees 2000

 Nancy Foster
 Adrian Phillips
 Marija Zupancic-Vicar

Packard Awardees 2001

 Clive Marsh
 Robert G. Stanton

Packard Awardees 2003

 Jean Chretien
 Lawrence S. Hamilton
 J. Michael McCloskey
 Carmen Miranda (Biologist)
 Mavuso Msimang
 Marshall Murphree

Packard Awardees 2004

 Bruce Amos (Conservationist)
 Imogen Zethoven and Virginia Chadwick
 Jaime Incer
 Allen Putney
 Vsevolod Stepanitskiy
 Jim Thorsell

Packard Awardees 2007

 Carlos Ponce del Prado

Packard Awardees 2008

 Muslih Al-Juaid
 Henri Blaffart
 Robert Cartagena
 Ernesto Enkerlin
 Maria Tereza
 Moses Mapesa
 George N. Wallace

Packard Awardees 2012

 Ibrahim Bello
 Yury Darman
 Julia Miranda Londoño
 Antonio Negrete

Packard Awardees 2014

 Grazia Borrini-Feyerabend
 Peter Cochrane (Scientist)
 Alan Latourelle
 Harvey Locke
 Cláudio C. Maretti
 The Rangers of Virunga National Park
 Widodo Sukohadi Ramono

Packard Awardees 2016

 Georgina Bustamente and Alessandra Vanzell-Khouri
 Roger Crofts
 Jon Jarvis
 Nik Lopoukhine
 Sonam Wangchuk (engineer)
 Graeme Worboys

Packard Awardees 2019

 Julio Alberto Carrera Lopez 
 Sonia Bone Guajajara & APIB
 Floyd Homer
 Carlos Alberto Pinto Dos Santos

Packard Awardees 2021

 James Barnes
 Silvana Campello
 Penelope Figgis
 Sarat Babu Gidda
 Dan Laffoley
 David (Dave) MacKinnon
 Denise M. Rambaldi
 Pedro Rosabal
 Romeo B. Trono

References

Environmental awards
International Union for Conservation of Nature
Poaching